Myospherulosis, also known as spherulocytosis, is a foreign body-type granulomatous reaction to lipid-containing material and blood.

It may be seen in various settings including: 
Fat necrosis.
Malignancy, e.g. renal cell carcinoma.
Placement of topical tetracycline in a petrolatum base into a surgical site. 

The resultant histopathologic pattern is most unusual and initially was mistakenly thought to represent a previously undescribed endosporulating fungus.

See also
Fat necrosis

References

Histopathology